Peter James Ciofrone (born September 28, 1983) is an American professional baseball player. An outfielder, Ciofrone played in minor league baseball.

Career
Ciofrone attended Smithtown High School. The Boston Red Sox selected him in the 16th round of the 2002 Major League Baseball draft. The Red Sox traded Ciofrone to the San Diego Padres in 2004.

Ciofrone participated in the 2009 World Baseball Classic as a member of the Italian national baseball team. He was eligible to play for Italy due to his Italian ancestry.

Personal
Ciofrone is from Long Island, New York. He has two older brothers.

References

1983 births
Living people
American people of Italian descent
People from Nesconset, New York
2009 World Baseball Classic players
Baseball outfielders
Gulf Coast Red Sox players
Augusta GreenJackets players
Fort Wayne Wizards players
Lake Elsinore Storm players
Mobile BayBears players
San Antonio Missions players
Portland Beavers players
Baseball players from New York (state)